Club Sportivo Miramar Misiones, usually known simply as Miramar Misiones is a Uruguayan football club based in Montevideo. The club was formed from the merger of two clubs: Miramar (founded on October 17, 1915) and Misiones (founded on March 26, 1906), in June 1980. As part of the merger, the new strip for the new club was a mixture of those of the previous two clubs. The home strip (white and black) is the old Miramar strip, and the away strip was the one used by Misiones. What made this merger notable was that Miramar and Misiones were local derby rivals, having both originated in the same neighbourhood of Montevideo.

Previous to the creation of this club, Miramar also merged with legendary club Albion in 1976, forming 'Albion Miramar'. However, this entity lasted for only 2 seasons.

Current squad

Managers
  Jorge González (Jan 1, 1996 – Dec 31, 1996)
  Roland Marcenaro (Jan 1, 2000 – Dec 31, 2003)
  Manuel Keosseián (June 1, 2005 – Oct 24, 2005)
  Julio Antúnez (May 24, 2010 – June 30, 2010)
  Roland Marcenaro (July 9, 2010 – Nov 16, 2010)
  Carlos Manta (Aug 15, 2011 – June 3, 2013)
  Luis Duarte (June 3, 2013 – Oct 7, 2013)
  Gonzalo de los Santos (Oct 9, 2013 – Feb 24, 2014)
  Daniel Sánchez (Feb 25, 2014–14)
  Carlos María Moralez (2014)

Presidents
  Don Carlos Gonzales (1980)
  Hector Camera (1990)
  Eduardo Felipez (2000)
  Hugo Casada (2005)
  Eugenio Gambetta Gabin (2015)

Titles
Segunda División Uruguay (2nd level): 3
1942, 1953 (as Miramar), 1986

 Divisional Intermedia: 2
 1917, 1935,, 1971

Segunda División Amateur (3rd level): 1
 1974 (as Misiones)

Divisional Extra (3rd level): 2
1917, 1937 (as Miramar)

Divisional Extra (4th level): 1
1953 (as Misiones)

Notes

External links
 Official Website
 Unofficial Website

 
Football clubs in Uruguay
Association football clubs established in 1906
1906 establishments in Uruguay